Ny Ellebjerg station is a railway station on the S-train and inter-city network in Copenhagen, Denmark. It serves as an interchange station between the Køge radial (A, E), the Ring line (F), and the Copenhagen–Ringsted Line (InterCity services).

It will change name to København Syd (Copenhagen South) by 2024, coinciding with the completion of the M4 Metro line.

Before the station opened on 6 January 2007, there was an S-train station called Ellebjerg station a few hundred metres southwest of the current station, where the Køge-Bugt railway passes over Ellebjergvej. That station is now closed.

Ny Ellebjerg Station will be the southern terminus of the planned M4 line of the Copenhagen Metro.

New platforms have in 2013 been opened for the high-speed Copenhagen–Ringsted Line, on which trains run via Køge Nord to Ringsted, in future at up to 250 km/h. Further platforms will be built around 2024 for trains going from Sweden to the high-speed Ringsted Line (intended for the Fehmarn Belt Fixed Link), or reverse.

See also

 List of railway stations in Denmark
 Rail transport in Denmark
 Transportation in Copenhagen
 Transportation in Denmark
 Danish State Railways
 Banedanmark

References

External links

Railway stations in Valby
S-train (Copenhagen) stations
Railway stations opened in 2007
Railway stations in Denmark opened in the 21st century